Ellipanthus beccarii is a plant in the family Connaraceae. It is named for the Italian botanist Odoardo Beccari.

Description
The unisexual flowers grow in groups of four.

Distribution and habitat
Ellipanthus beccarii is native to Sumatra and Borneo. Its habitat is mixed dipterocarp forest.

References

Connaraceae
Trees of Borneo
Trees of Sumatra
Plants described in 1898
Flora of the Borneo lowland rain forests